When We Were Small is the debut album by American singer-songwriter Rosie Thomas, released in 2002.

Reception

Pitchfork Media rated the album 7.3 out of 10, with reviewer Brad Haywood calling it "a solid debut, long on talent but maybe a bit short on melody or lacking in appropriate production". Allmusic awarded it four stars, with Tom Semioli calling it a "mesmerizing debut outing". Indy Week described it as "a quiet collection of songs that tend to spotlight the lyrics, and in Thomas' case, that's definitely a plus". Geoffrey Himes, writing for the Washington Post, commented on Thomas's "frail, breathy soprano that offers reluctant confessions over minimalist keyboard settings".

Track listing
All songs written by Rosie Thomas.

 "2 Dollar Shoes" – 3:10
 "Farewell" – 3:12
 "Wedding Day" – 5:26
 "Lorraine" – 3:24
 "Finish Line" – 2:40
 "October" – 2:21
 "I Run" – 4:07
 "Charlotte" – 3:19
 "Have You Seen My Love?" – 2:56
 "Bicycle Tricycle" – 6:04

References 

Rosie Thomas (singer-songwriter) albums
Albums produced by Martin Feveyear
2001 debut albums
Sub Pop albums